Phunchok Stobdan (born 20 December 1958) is a former Indian civil servant and served as the Indian ambassador to Kyrgyzstan. He was also a senior fellow at Institute for Defence Studies and Analyses, New Delhi, and was the founding president of the Ladakh International Centre.

Stobdan is an academician, diplomat and author, and regarded as an expert on Indian foreign policy and national security on Central and Inner Asian affairs.

Career 
He has earlier served in the National Security Council Secretariat (NSCS), which reports to National Security Advisor.

Works 
Stobdan is author of the book The Great Game in the Buddhist Himalayas: India and China’s Quest for Strategic Dominance. The book looks at China–India relations through prism of Buddhist Himalayas.

Stobdan also writes columns for The Indian Express and The Tribune (Chandigarh).

References

External links
 Author profile at Penguin India
  – An excerpt from The Great Game in the Buddhist Himalayas
 

Living people
1958 births
Ambassadors of India to Kyrgyzstan
Ladakhi people
People from Ladakh